Matebian or Matebean is the third highest mountain in Timor Leste, after Ramelau (Tatamailau).

Geography 
The mountain is located in Baucau District. With an elevation of  it is among the ultra-prominent peaks of the Malay archipelago.

At the peak is a statue of Christ.

Gallery

References

Mountains of East Timor
Two-thousanders of East Timor